Jaloliddin Masharipov (Uzbek Latin: Jaloliddin Masharipov; Russian: Джалолидин Машарипов; born 1 September 1993) is an Uzbek professional footballer who plays as a midfielder for Saudi Professional League club Al Nassr and the Uzbekistan national team.

Playing career

Club
In July 2020, it was reported that he was linked to Süper Lig team Trabzonspor.

Masharipov played a key role in Pakhtakor's 2020 season, scoring nine goals and had 22 assists in 35 appearances in all competitions. However, his early exit after receiving a red card had a major role in his team's loss against Persepolis in the 2020 AFC Champions League quarter-finals.

On 26 December 2020, he signed for Saudi club Al Nassr. Next month, Masharipov was sent on loan to Emirati club Shabab Al-Ahli.

International
Masharipov played for Uzbekistan U-20 since 2013. He was also called up in 2015 for the King's Cup in Thailand, but he received a red card in the first half after launching a flying, studs-up kick into the chest of South Korea's Kang Sang-woo. Later he was also called up for senior team and Masharipov made his first appearance in national team on 6 October 2016, replacing Sardor Rashidov as substitute in the 61st minute, in a 0–1 loss 2018 World Cup qualifier game against Iran.

Career statistics

Club

International

Statistics accurate as of match played 14 June 2022.

International goals
Scores and results list Uzbekistan's goal tally first.

Honours
Pakhtakor
Uzbekistan Super League: 2014, 2015, 2019, 2020
Uzbekistan Cup: 2019, 2020
Uzbekistan League Cup: 2019

Lokomotiv Tashkent
Uzbekistan Super League: 2017
Uzbekistan Cup: 2017

Shabab Al-Ahli
UAE League Cup: 2020–21
UAE President's Cup: 2020–21

Individual
Uzbekistan Super League Top Assists: 2020
AFC Champions League OPTA Best Midfielder (west) XI: 2020
Uzbek FA Player of the Year: 2020
UAE League Cup Man of Match: 2020–21

References

External links

1993 births
Association football midfielders
Living people
Uzbekistan international footballers
Uzbekistani footballers
Uzbekistani expatriate footballers
Pakhtakor Tashkent FK players
PFC Lokomotiv Tashkent players
Al Nassr FC players
Shabab Al-Ahli Club players
Uzbekistan Super League players
Saudi Professional League players
UAE Pro League players
Footballers at the 2018 Asian Games
2019 AFC Asian Cup players
Asian Games competitors for Uzbekistan
Expatriate footballers in Saudi Arabia
Expatriate footballers in the United Arab Emirates
Uzbekistani expatriate sportspeople in Saudi Arabia
Uzbekistani expatriate sportspeople in the United Arab Emirates